Gideoni Rodrigues Monteiro (born ) is a Brazilian male road and track cyclist.

Career

On the road he competed at the 2008 UCI Road World Championships and 2009 UCI Road World Championships. He competed in the omnium event at the 2015 UCI Track Cycling World Championships.

He competed in the omnium event at the 2016 UCI Track Cycling World Championships finishing 18th. Thus he also guaranteed his classification to 2016 Olympic Games in Rio de Janeiro.

References

External links
 Profile at cyclingarchives.com

1989 births
Living people
Brazilian male cyclists
Brazilian road racing cyclists
Brazilian track cyclists
Place of birth missing (living people)
Cyclists at the 2015 Pan American Games
Pan American Games bronze medalists for Brazil
Olympic cyclists of Brazil
Cyclists at the 2016 Summer Olympics
Pan American Games medalists in cycling
Medalists at the 2015 Pan American Games